Rolling Home is a 1935 British comedy film directed by Ralph Ince and starring Will Fyffe and Molly Lamont. It was made at Shepperton Studios.

Cast
 Will Fyffe as John McGregor 
 Ralph Ince as Wally
 Molly Lamont as Ann
 Ruth Maitland as Mrs. Murray
 Jock McKay as Jock
 Margaret Moffat as Mrs. McGregor 
 James Raglan as Captain Pengelly
 Harold Saxon-Snell as Callaghan

References

Bibliography
 Low, Rachael. Filmmaking in 1930s Britain. George Allen & Unwin, 1985.
 Wood, Linda. British Films, 1927-1939. British Film Institute, 1986.

External links

1935 films
British black-and-white films
British comedy films
1935 comedy films
1930s English-language films
Films shot at Shepperton Studios
Seafaring films
Films directed by Ralph Ince
Films with screenplays by Marriott Edgar
1930s British films